Mexico competed at the 2014 Winter Olympics in Sochi, Russia from 7 to 23 February 2014. The team once again consisted of Hubertus von Hohenlohe competing in Alpine skiing. Hubertus von Hohenlohe became the second oldest Winter Olympian ever, and also break the longest span of competing at the winter Olympics (30 years).

Competitors

Alpine skiing 

According to the final quota allocation released on January 20, 2014, Mexico had one athlete in qualification position. Hubertus von Hohenlohe wore a traditional Mariachi suit while competing. Hubertus von Hohenlohe crashed while competing in his only race (the slalom).

See also
Mexico at the 2014 Summer Youth Olympics
Mexico at the 2014 Winter Paralympics

References

External links 
Mexico at the 2014 Winter Olympics

Nations at the 2014 Winter Olympics
2014
2014 in Mexican sports